A shading coil or shading ring (Also called Frager spire or Frager coil) is a single (or a few) turn of electrical conductor (usually copper or aluminum) located in the face of the magnet assembly or armature of an alternating current solenoid. The alternating current in the energized primary coil induces an alternating current in the shading coil. This induced current creates an auxiliary magnetic flux which is 90 degrees out of phase from the magnetic flux created by the primary coil. 

Because of the 90 degree phase difference between the current in the shading coil and the current in the primary coil, the shading coil maintains a magnetic flux and hence a force between the armature and the assembly while the current in the primary coil crosses zero. Without this shading ring, the armature would tend to open each time the main flux goes through zero and create noise, heat and mechanical damages on the magnet faces (e.g. reducing the bouncing of relay or power contacts and the chatter)

Shaded-pole AC motors
A shaded pole motor is an AC single phase induction motor. Its includes an auxiliary winding composed of a copper ring called a shading ring (or shading coil with more than one turn).

The auxiliary winding produces a secondary magnetic flux which, along with the flux from the primary coil, forms a rotating magnetic field suitable for applying torque to and rotating the rotor. These devices are typically used as low-cost motors for microwave oven fans.

References

External links

 Engineer's Relay Handbook, 5th edition, published by the Relay and Switch Industry Association (RSIA) – formerly NARM
 Information about relays and the Latching Relay circuit
 "Harry Porter's Relay Computer", a computer made out of relays
 "Relay Computer Two", by Jon Stanley

AC motors
Electromagnetic components
Power engineering
Relays